Carex leporina is a species of sedge known in the British Isles as oval sedge and in North America as eggbract sedge. It is native to Eurasia and eastern and western North America, where it grows in seasonally wet habitat, such as meadows and fields. This sedge produces many thin stems and narrow leaves. The inflorescence is an open cluster of several flower spikes. The pistillate flower has a reddish or brownish bract with a gold center and white tip.

References

External links
Jepson Manual Treatment
USDA Plants Profile
Photo gallery
Carex leporina, The Linnaean Plant Name Typification Project
The Carex leporina/ovalis/leporina name problem (February 2008) Carex Working Group

leporina
Plants described in 1753
Taxa named by Carl Linnaeus